Charles Rowland Allanson-Winn, 7th Baron Headley (1902–1994), was an Irish Peer.  He was the last of the Headley Barony.

Biography

The son of Rowland Allanson-Winn, 5th Baron Headley, Charles Allanson-Winn was born on 19 May 1902 and educated at Bedford School.  He succeeded to the title of Baron Headley upon the death of his elder brother, Rowland Allanson-Winn, 6th Baron Headley (1901–1969).

Upon the death of Charles Allanson-Winn, 7th Baron Headley, on 23 February 1994, the Headley Barony became extinct.

References 

1902 births
1994 deaths
People educated at Bedford School
Barons in the Peerage of Ireland